Asasegawa Takeya (born 4 May 1942 as Kenji Kameyama, died 22 September 2017) was a sumo wrestler from Naniwa-ku, Osaka, Japan. He made his professional debut in May 1957 and reached the top division in March 1964. His highest rank was maegashira 1. Upon retirement from active competition he became an elder in the Japan Sumo Association under the name Urakaze. He left the Association in January 1975.

Career record
The Nagoya tournament was first held in 1958.

See also
Glossary of sumo terms
List of past sumo wrestlers
List of sumo tournament second division champions

References

1942 births
2017 deaths
Japanese sumo wrestlers
Sumo people from Osaka Prefecture
People from Kawachinagano